Anapatetris is a genus of moths in the family Gelechiidae. It contains the species Anapatetris crystallista, which is found in Gauteng, South Africa.

The wingspan is about 10 mm. The forewings are white, sprinkled with black specks suffused with brownish, especially along the costa and dorsum and on two longitudinal streaks in the disc above and below middle, the upper extending from the base to three-quarters, the lower shorter, and three longitudinal marks before and beyond the tornus and at the apex. The hindwings are light grey.

References

Endemic moths of South Africa
Apatetrinae
Taxa named by Edward Meyrick
Monotypic moth genera
Moths of Africa